Lesly Fellinga (born September 29, 1985 in Port-au-Prince) is a Haitian retired football player, who played at left defense position.

Playing career

Club
Fellinga was born in the Cité Soleil commune of Port-au-Prince, Haiti, but adopted when he was a baby and grew up in Zuidlaren in the Netherlands. He played youth soccer for local teams ZVZ and ZFC Zuidlaren. In 1996, he was scouted by FC Groningen and started to play in the youth teams.

In 2006, he joined Eerste Divisie club Veendam, and was a regular feature for the club in the 2007–2008 season. Eredivisie club Heerenveen picked him up in a summer 2008 transfer. He made his first team debut for Heerenveen on September 18, 2008 in a European match against Vitória in Portugal . He also played the return leg on October 2, 2008 in Heerenveen.

On August 12, 2009, Fellinga signed with Toronto FC following a successful trial. Fellinga made his debut for Toronto as a sub in a home game against Colorado Rapids on September 12, 2009, and played four MLS games before being released in December of the same year, after Preki became head coach.
He joined Groningen amateurclub Gronitas halfway season 2009–2010 and since start season 2010–2011 he played for Frisian amateurclub Harkemase Boys in the Topklasse League, the highest amateur league of the Netherlands, while simultaneously studying communication in Groningen. In 2012 he moved on to fellow amateurs Oranje Nassau.

International
Fellinga was selected for the Dutch U15, U17 and U19 national teams while playing with Groningen, and played for the Dutch national U15 team against Spain during the international Walker tournament in England in 2001, but was never called up by the senior Dutch national team.

Sensing that opportunities with the Dutch national team would be limited, Fellinga accepted a call up to the Haiti national football team for a friendly against Panama in March 2007. He made his debut for the Haiti U21 selection in a game against the United States in Dallas, Texas, a few days later. After that he played four games with the Haitian Olympic team to qualify for the Olympic of Beijing 2008.

His made his senior debut came in a World Cup qualifier against the Netherlands Antilles in June 2008. He played five games in the qualification for the 2010 FIFA World Cup, and was a member of the Haitian team for the CONCACAF Gold Cup in 2009.

References

External links

 
 Fellinga: Let’s put Haiti on the map (fifa.com)

1985 births
Living people
Sportspeople from Port-au-Prince
People from Tynaarlo
Dutch people of Haitian descent
Association football fullbacks
Dutch footballers
Haitian footballers
Haiti international footballers
2009 CONCACAF Gold Cup players
FC Groningen players
SC Veendam players
SC Heerenveen players
Toronto FC players
Eerste Divisie players
Major League Soccer players
Footballers from Drenthe
Dutch expatriate sportspeople in Canada
Haitian expatriate sportspeople in Canada
Expatriate soccer players in Canada
Haitian emigrants to the Netherlands
Naturalised citizens of the Netherlands
Dutch adoptees